For the state pageant affiliated with Miss Teen USA, see Miss New York Teen USA

The Miss New York's Outstanding Teen competition is the pageant that selects the representative for the U.S. state of New York in Miss America's Outstanding Teen pageant.

Dajania James of Rochester was crowned Miss New York's Outstanding Teen on May 29, 2022 at Paramount Hudson Valley Theater in Peekskill, New York. She competed for the title of Miss America's Outstanding Teen 2023 at the Hyatt Regency Dallas in Dallas, Texas on August 12, 2022 where she placed 4th runner-up.

Results summary 
The year in parentheses indicates year of Miss America's Outstanding Teen competition the award/placement was garnered.

Placements 
 Miss America's Outstanding Teen: Maria DeSantis (2007)
 4th runner-up: Dajania James (2023)

Awards

Preliminary awards 
 Preliminary Talent: Maria DeSantis (2007), Alison Stroming (2011), Asia Hickman (2018)

Non-finalist awards 
 Non-finalist Interview: Alisa Vasquez (2016)
Non-finalist Evening Wear/OSQ: Cayla Kumar (2019)
Non-finalist Talent: Cayla Kumar (2019)

Other awards 
 Spirit of America: Shannon Ryan (2013), Alisa Vasquez (2016)
 Outstanding Instrumental Talent: Asia Hickman (2018)
Overall Dance Talent: Cayla Kumar (2019)
Teens in Action Award Finalists: Cayla Kumar (2019)

Winners

References

External links
 Official website

New York
New York (state) culture
Women in New York (state)
Annual events in New York (state)